Fengjia may refer to:

Fengjia Subdistrict (冯家街道), a subdistrict in Qianjiang District, Chongqing, China
Fengjia Night Market (逢甲夜市), a night market in Xitun District, Taichung, Taiwan

Towns
Fengjia, Hunan (奉家), in Xinhua County, Hunan, China
Fengjia, Liaoning (冯家), in Zhangwu County, Liaoning, China
Fengjia, Binzhou (冯家), in Zhanhua District, Binzhou, Shandong, China
Fengjia, Rushan (冯家), in Rushan, Shandong, China

See also
Feng Chia University, a university in Xitun District, Taichung, Taiwan
Pengjia islet